The Filmfare Award for Best Cinematographer Award - South is given by the Filmfare magazine as part of its annual Filmfare Awards for South Indian films.

Here is a list of the award winners and the films for which they won.

See also 
 Filmfare Awards South
 Cinema of Andhra Pradesh

References

Cinematographer
Awards for best cinematography